Józef Bogusław Słuszka (1652 - 8 October 1701) was a nobleman, statesman and commander of the Grand Duchy of Lithuania. He served as its hetman from 25 April 1685 to 1701 and also became castellan of Vilnius.

Sources (in Polish)
http://www.bilp.uw.edu.pl/ti/1861/foto/nn59.htm
http://www.archive.org/stream/herbarzpolskipow08niesuoft/herbarzpolskipow08niesuoft_djvu.txt

1652 births
1701 deaths
Field Hetmans of the Grand Duchy of Lithuania
Court Marshals of the Grand Duchy of Lithuania